Yemelyanovo is the name of several inhabited localities in Russia.

Modern localities
Urban localities
Yemelyanovo, Krasnoyarsk Krai, a work settlement in Yemelyanovsky District of Krasnoyarsk Krai

Rural localities
Yemelyanovo, Pestyakovsky District, Ivanovo Oblast, a village in Pestyakovsky District of Ivanovo Oblast
Yemelyanovo, Yuzhsky District, Ivanovo Oblast, a village in Yuzhsky District of Ivanovo Oblast
Yemelyanovo, Zavolzhsky District, Ivanovo Oblast, a village in Zavolzhsky District of Ivanovo Oblast
Yemelyanovo, Luzsky District, Kirov Oblast, a village in Papulovsky Rural Okrug of Luzsky District in Kirov Oblast
Yemelyanovo, Pizhansky District, Kirov Oblast, a village in Izhevsky Rural Okrug of Pizhansky District in Kirov Oblast
Yemelyanovo, Buysky District, Kostroma Oblast, a village in Tsentralnoye Settlement of Buysky District in Kostroma Oblast
Yemelyanovo, Galichsky District, Kostroma Oblast, a village in Berezovskoye Settlement of Galichsky District in Kostroma Oblast
Yemelyanovo, Moscow Oblast, a village in Gorskoye Rural Settlement of Orekhovo-Zuyevsky District in Moscow Oblast
Yemelyanovo, Pechorsky District, Pskov Oblast, a village in Pechorsky District of Pskov Oblast
Yemelyanovo, Pskovsky District, Pskov Oblast, a village in Pskovsky District of Pskov Oblast
Yemelyanovo, Kazulinskoye Rural Settlement, Safonovsky District, Smolensk Oblast, a village in Kazulinskoye Rural Settlement of Safonovsky District in Smolensk Oblast
Yemelyanovo, Prudkovskoye Rural Settlement, Safonovsky District, Smolensk Oblast, a village in Prudkovskoye Rural Settlement of Safonovsky District in Smolensk Oblast
Yemelyanovo, Republic of Tatarstan, a selo in Laishevsky District of the Republic of Tatarstan
Yemelyanovo, Belsky District, Tver Oblast, a village in Budinskoye Rural Settlement of Belsky District in Tver Oblast
Yemelyanovo, Staritsky District, Tver Oblast, a selo in Yemelyanovskoye Rural Settlement of Staritsky District in Tver Oblast
Yemelyanovo, Vesyegonsky District, Tver Oblast, a village in Lyubegoshchinskoye Rural Settlement of Vesyegonsky District in Tver Oblast
Yemelyanovo, Vologda Oblast, a village in Spassky Selsoviet of Vologodsky District in Vologda Oblast

Abolished localities
Yemelyanovo, Nizhny Novgorod Oblast, a village in Semenovsky Selsoviet of Urensky District in Nizhny Novgorod Oblast; abolished in September 2013

Alternative names
Yemelyanovo, alternative name of Yemelyanova, a village in Velyaminovsky Rural Administrative Okrug of Karachevsky District in Bryansk Oblast;

See also
Yemelyanovsky, several rural localities in Russia